Medlen is a surname of English descent, derived from Medlin. Notable people with the surname include: 

Eric Medlen (1973–2007), American racing car driver
Kris Medlen (born 1985), American baseball player
Pamela Medlen, Australian journalist

References

Surnames of English origin